Flanimals is a book series written by comedian Ricky Gervais and illustrated by Rob Steen. It depicts an assortment of seemingly useless or inadequate fictional animals and their behaviour.

The cover Flanimal is the Grundit. The book is published by Faber and Faber, which has also published the sequels More Flanimals, Flanimals of the Deep and Flanimals: The Day of the Bletchling. Flanimals: Pop Up was published October 2009 by Walker Books in the UK and in March 2010 by Candlewick Press in the US.

List of Flanimals
 Coddleflop: A green mush puddle that flips over to protect its soft top. However, since its bottom is equally soft, this strategy is never successful.
 Plamglotis: A purple ape-like Flanimal with no legs so it swallows its hands to walk around to find food, which it cannot eat because its mouth is full.
 Mernimbler: A fluffy, pink, round Flanimal that transforms into an aggressive, ogre-like adult stage when someone comments on its cuteness.
 Grundit: A heavily built blue Flanimal with a bump on its head.
 Puddloflaj: A pink water balloon-like Flanimal often ridden by Grundits for no clear reason.
 Flemping Bunt-Himmler: A mimic and predator of the baby Mernimbler, only wider and flatter.
 Underblenge: A grey, blobby Flanimal that cannot move from where it was born due to it having extremely strong suction cups (designed for suffocating prey) on its underside.
 Blunging: A yellow dinosaur-like Flanimal that lives in large family groups.
 Munty Flumple: A brown humanoid Flanimal that stares at every Flanimal it sees.
 Splunge: A brain-like Flanimal so terrified of everything that it "splunges" at birth.
 Honk: A small, pink, tapir-like Flanimal that sleeps all day until it randomly wakes up to make a loud honking sound and then goes back to sleep.
 Hemel Sprot: A green blobby Flanimal that always looks where it has been and never where it is going.
 Sprot Guzzlor: A large blue Flanimal that preys on Hemel Sprots.
 Clunge Ambler: An ape-like Flanimal that hugs everything it sees.
 Wobboid Mump: A blind eye in jelly that spends its entire life looking for the reason for its existence.
 Sprine Bloat-Trunker: An orange Flanimal that erupts from Sprog and Hemel Sprot recycling plant, and then joins the queue to be recycled.
 Print: A humanoid Flanimal that dives off high places but always lands on its head.
 Gum Spudlet: A Flanimal that resembles a solid version of the Coddleflop and is eaten by Grundits.
 Sprog: A small, vicious, beetroot-like Flanimal.
 Munge Fuddler: A crab-like Flanimal that "fuddles" everything it sees.
 Frappled Humpdumbler: An octopus-like Flanimal with an eye on one side of its head and a nose on the other.
 Offledermis: A Flanimal born inside out to escape its own smell. It has a heart above its inside out eyeballs and constantly leaks.
 Plumboid Doppler: A round green Flanimal with eyestalks.
 Blimble Sprent: A yellow, fast-moving Flanimal without arms that sprints everywhere, avoiding its destination until it dies of exhaustion at the very spot where it started.
 Glonk: A green reptilian humanoid Flanimal that does absolutely nothing and dies. It is also known that it eats pizza.

Originality dispute
In August 2010, Norwich-based writer and artist John Savage issued a High Court writ, claiming that the original Flanimals book was based on his own Captain Pottie's Wildlife Encyclopedia, and that his artistic and literary copyright had been infringed. A spokeswoman for Gervais said that the concept and illustrations existed before Savage's work.

Adaptations
ITV commissioned a television series based on the books, with a planned air date of 2009, but it was later cancelled.

On 28 April 2009, Variety reported that a 3-D, computer-animated feature film was in production at Illumination Entertainment, known for its 2010 summer blockbuster Despicable Me. It said that Gervais would be the executive producer and would voice the lead character, and that The Simpsons writer Matt Selman would write the script. However, it has since been removed from the development schedule, leaving its future uncertain, and no further details have been released about it since 2009.

References

External links

 Pictures from the book in the BBC website
 Flanimals on Ricky Gervais's site
 Flanimals on Rob Steen's site
 Flanimals on MySpace
 

Book series introduced in 2004
2004 children's books
British children's books
British picture books
Children's fiction books
Books by Ricky Gervais
Faber and Faber books
Speculative evolution
Books involved in plagiarism controversies